Richard Petty's Talladega (later reissued simply as Talladega) is an arcade-style racing game featuring Richard Petty and Talladega Superspeedway. It was published by Cosmi in 1984 for the Atari 8-bit family. A Commodore 64 port followed in 1985. It is the first home video game to feature NASCAR racers.

Gameplay

The player races against "The King" and eighteen other professional drivers. The player must maintain his automobile through strategic pit stops after qualifying. Vehicles in the game have the capability of going 250 miles per hour (402 km/h) without turbo boost and 294 miles per hour (473 km/h) with a turbo boost.

Players that do not qualify are not entitled to race in that particular race. However, they can receive the results of that race, and are given a chance to qualify for the next race. The race automatically ends when the player crashes the vehicle, runs out of gasoline, blows a tire or completes the race.

Reception
Commodore User said the game was similar to Pole Position and Pitstop. They felt the strategic elements of the game made it worth playing but the slow start was a weakness. They also criticised the game for being too long and said they had no idea who Richard Petty was. The game was rated 4/5 for value for money.

Zzap!64 thought the graphics "tacky" and the sound "irritating" but found the gameplay to have "quite an addictive quality." They found the presentation inferior to Pitstop II. The game was given a 69% rating.

Zzap reviewed the game again a few months later in a feature on racing games. Julian Rignall was unimpressed by the "flickery graphics and pretty feeble sound" but said the game was "pretty addictive and challenging", although not as good as Speed King or Pitstop II. This time a 64% overall rating was given.

References

1984 video games
Ariolasoft games
Atari 8-bit family games
Commodore 64 games
Electronic Arts games
Cosmi Corporation games
NASCAR video games
Richard Petty's Talladega
Video games based on real people
Video games developed in the United States